PK-77 Peshawar-IX is a constituency for the Khyber Pakhtunkhwa Assembly of the Khyber Pakhtunkhwa province of Pakistan.

Members of Assembly

2018-2022 PK-74 Peshawar-IX

Elections 2018 
Pir Fida Muhammad of Pakistan Tehreek-e-Insaf won the seat by getting 19,379 votes.

See also 

 PK-76 Peshawar-VIII
 PK-78 Peshawar-X

References

External links 

 Khyber Pakhtunkhwa Assembly's official website
 Election Commission of Pakistan's official website
 Awaztoday.com Search Result
 Election Commission Pakistan Search Result

Khyber Pakhtunkhwa Assembly constituencies